Bystrzejowice A is a village in the administrative district of Gmina Piaski, within Świdnik County, Lublin Voivodeship, in eastern Poland.

The village has a population of 750.

References

Bystrzejowice A